LSTV may refer to:

 Leeds Student Television
 Lok Sabha Television
 Lumbosacral transitional vertebra